Events from the year 2003 in the United Arab Emirates.

Incumbents
President: Zayed bin Sultan Al Nahyan 
Prime Minister: Maktoum bin Rashid Al Maktoum

Establishments
September - Abu Dhabi University.

References

 
Years of the 21st century in the United Arab Emirates
United Arab Emirates
United Arab Emirates
2000s in the United Arab Emirates